General Abdul Jabbar Khalil Shanshal al-Bakri (1920 – 20 September 2014) born in Mosul, Iraq was an Iraqi senior officer and war minister for a very long period of time, also he held the position of minister of military affairs and chief of staff.

 He graduated from the Iraqi military college in Baghdad in 1940 (cycle 18)

References 

Iraqi military leaders
People from Mosul
1920 births
2014 deaths
Iraqi Military Academy alumni